Someday We'll Look Back is the thirteenth studio album by American recording artist Merle Haggard and The Strangers, released in 1971. It reached number 4 on the Billboard country albums chart.

Recording and composition

The album is best remembered for the number-one hit, "Carolyn", written by Haggard's friend and mentor Tommy Collins. Haggard had his doubts that the pop-tinged ballad was right for him, as Collins explains in the liner notes to the 1994 Haggard retrospective Down Every Road, "He said, 'It's just not for me. It's not country enough or something.' And the only time I ever said this to Merle was at this time. I said, 'Would you give it a try?'  And (co-producer) Lewis Talley said, 'Hey, you oughta cut that song. That's a hit.'" Haggard also returns to the theme of the plight of the working poor on "One Row at a Time," "California Cotton Fields," and the self-penned "Tulare Dust," a song that led music journalist Daniel Cooper to observe in 1994, "Merle has often driven home the point that life is hard, but he's never driven it with quite so few words as he does in 'Tulare Dust.'" The LP's title track was another Top 5 hit, peaking at number 2.

Reception

AllMusic critic Stephen Thomas Erlewine called the album "a terrific early-'70s LP from Merle Haggard, one that showcases not only his exceptional songwriting skills, but also his rich, subtle eclectism... one of the finest albums he ever recorded." Music critic Robert Christgau wrote "An honest two days' work, but don't let the keynote tune fool you into expecting a lot of class-conscious reminiscences."

Track listing
All songs by Merle Haggard unless otherwise noted.

"Someday We'll Look Back" – 2:31
"Train of Life" (Roger Miller) – 2:42
"One Sweet Hello" – 2:47
"One Row at a Time" (Red Lane, Dottie West) – 3:06
"Big Time Annie's Square" – 2:34
"I'd Rather be Gone" – 2:35
"California Cottonfields" (Dallas Frazier, Earl Montgomery) – 2:46
"Carolyn" (Tommy Collins) – 2:33
"Tulare Dust" – 1:47
"Huntsville" (Haggard, Red Simpson) – 3:06
"The Only Trouble With Me" – 3:11

Personnel
Merle Haggard– vocals, guitar

The Strangers:
Roy Nichols – lead guitar
Norman Hamlet – steel guitar, dobro
Bobby Wayne - rhythm guitar, background vocals
Dennis Hromek – bass, background vocals
Biff Adam – drums

with
Lewis Talley – guitar
Red Lane – guitar
Tommy Collins– guitar
George French – piano
Jerry Ward – bass
Eddie Burris – drums
Johnny Gimble – fiddle

and
James Burton – guitar, dobro
Glen Campbell – guitar, background vocals
Glen D. Hardin – piano
Hargus "Pig" Robbins – piano
Willard Price – bass
Leon Copeland – bass
Chuck Berghofer – bass
Tommy Ash – drums

Chart positions

References

1971 albums
Merle Haggard albums
Capitol Records albums
Albums produced by Ken Nelson (United States record producer)

Albums recorded at Capitol Studios